Markus Kurth (born 30 July 1973 in Neuss, North Rhine-Westphalia) is a German football manager and former footballer. He is currently the manager of SC Mülheim Nord

References

External links
 
 Markus Kurth at glubberer.de 
 
 Markus Kurth on Fupa

1973 births
Living people
Sportspeople from Neuss
German footballers
Bayer 04 Leverkusen players
1. FC Nürnberg players
1. FC Köln players
MSV Duisburg players
Rot-Weiss Essen players
Bundesliga players
2. Bundesliga players
21st-century German politicians
Association football forwards
Footballers from North Rhine-Westphalia